In the United States, a party store is a store that sells supplies for parties. Merchandise may include:
 Balloons and streamers
 Wrapping paper, greeting cards
 Cake decoration items
 Seasonal holiday items (Christmas, Hanukkah, July 4th, Halloween, Thanksgiving, etc.)
 Candy and soft drinks
 Plates, utensils, cups (especially disposable ones for parties) and table decorations
In 2019 a global shortage of helium sharply reduced supply for helium-filled balloons, due to the US rationing helium because of a reduction in supply by 30% stemming from a Saudi-boycott of producer country Qatar, hurting party stores such as Party City, one of the reasons the company cited in closing 45 of its 870 stores.
In Michigan and some other parts of the United States, "party store" may also be a local synonym for convenience store.

See also
See articles about party stores on Wikipedia

References

Retailers by type of merchandise sold